The following events occurred in March 1961:

March 1, 1961 (Wednesday)
President of the United States John F. Kennedy established the Peace Corps by Executive Order 10924.
Uganda became self-governing by holding its first general elections a year in advance of full independence. With 90% of the 1.3 million eligible voters participating, the Democratic Party, led by Benedicto Kiwanuka, won 43 of the 81 seats in the National Assembly.  The Uganda People's Congress received more votes overall, but won only 35 seats.

March 2, 1961 (Thursday)
Algerian nationalist leader Ferhat Abbas announced in Rabat, Morocco, that the FLN had agreed to French President Charles de Gaulle's proposal to begin peace talks on Algerian independence. By then, the Algerian War was in its seventh year.
Congolese soldiers killed 44 civilians in the city of Luluabourg (now Kananga), capital of the Kasai province.
At the age of 79, artist Pablo Picasso married 35-year-old Jacqueline Roque. The two remained together until his death in 1973.
Evaluation of the Mercury-Atlas 2 (MA-2) flight results disclosed that the spacecraft afterbody temperatures were somewhat lower than had been anticipated.
Twenty-two coal miners were killed in an underground explosion at the Viking Coal Company near Terre Haute, Indiana.
Died: Olaf Hagerup, 71, Danish botanist

March 3, 1961 (Friday)
Hassan II was formally enthroned as King of Morocco, one week after his father's death.
Elsie May Batten, a 59-year-old shop assistant and wife of famed sculptor Mark Batten, was found stabbed to death with an antique dagger at the London curiosity shop where she worked. Her killer, Edwin Bush, was the first British murderer to be caught by use of the Identikit facial composite system.
The U.S. Air Force successfully launched the first of its "economy" rockets, the RM-90 Blue Scout II, designed to put payloads into space at a lower cost.
Factory roll-out inspection of Atlas launch vehicle No. 100-D was conducted at Convair-Astronautics. This launch vehicle was allocated for the Mercury-Atlas 3 (MA-3) mission.
Died: Paul Wittgenstein, 73, Austrian-born pianist

March 4, 1961 (Saturday)
 was commissioned as the Indian Navy's first aircraft carrier.
The Soviet Union made its first successful test of its V-1000 anti-ballistic missile system, proving that it could intercept an intercontinental ballistic missile. The ICBM, an R-12 Dvina (referred to by NATO as the SS-4), was fired from the Kapustin Yar in southwest Russia.
Former U.S. President Dwight D. Eisenhower became, once again, a five-star general, as an act of Congress restored him to his former rank of General of the Army.
The centennial of the presidential inauguration of Abraham Lincoln was observed with a re-enactment at the east front of the U.S. Capitol. A crowd of 20,000 people watched, twice as many as had witnessed the actual event in 1861.
Born: Ray 'Boom-Boom' Mancini, American boxer best remembered for the tragic 1982 bout with Duk Koo Kim; WBA lightweight champion, 1982–84; in Youngstown, Ohio
Died: Pudge Wyman, 65, American pro football player credited with the first NFL touchdown. Wyman played for the Rock Island Independents in their 45-0 win over the Muncie Flyers on October 3, 1920.

March 5, 1961 (Sunday)
The crash of a U.S. Air Force Boeing KB-50 refueling plane killed all ten men on board.
Born: Marcelo Peralta, Argentinian musician, in Buenos Aires (d. 2020)
Died: Kjeld Abell, 59, Danish playwright, shortly after finishing his last work, Skriget (The Scream)

March 6, 1961 (Monday)
The phrase "affirmative action" was first used to refer to a governmental requirement to promote equal opportunity by giving preferences in order to remedy prior discrimination. President Kennedy used the term with the issuance of Executive Order 10925. The original context was in Section 301 of the order, providing that federal government contracts include a provision that "The contractor will take affirmative action to ensure that applicants are employed, and that employees are treated during employment, without regard to their race, creed, color, or national origin."
"Detailed Test Objectives for NASA Mission MA-3" was published.
From March 6 to 7, the third in the series of development engineering inspections on Mercury spacecraft was held. At this time, spacecraft Nos. 12 and 15 were inspected, and some 50 requests for alterations were made.
The British soap opera Coronation Street was fully networked by ITV, with a new schedule of Monday and Wednesday evenings at 19:30.
Born: Bill Buchanan, Scottish academic, computer scientist, cryptographer, first person to receive an OBE for services to Cyber Security at the 2017 Birthday Honours, in Falkirk, Scotland
Died: George Formby, Jr., 56, British singer, comedian and actor

March 7, 1961 (Tuesday)
Spacecraft No. 11 was delivered to Cape Canaveral for the Mercury-Redstone 4 (MR-4) ballistic crewed (Grissom) flight.
Redstone launch vehicle No. 5 was delivered to Cape Canaveral for the Mercury-Redstone, Booster Development flight (MR-BD).
The successful test firing of the engines of a Titan I missile, as it stood inside the underground SLTF (Silo Test Launch Facility) at California's Vandenberg Air Force Base, demonstrated that a missile could be successfully fired from within a missile silo. An actual launch from the silo would not take place until May 3.
White would become the first person to break Mach 5 on June 23, and Mach 6 on November 9.
Born: Martina Schettina, Austrian painter, in Vienna
Died: Govind Ballabh Pant, 73, Indian statesman, and the first Chief Minister of Uttar Pradesh, 1946 to 1954

March 8, 1961 (Wednesday)
Max Conrad, "the Flying Grandfather", circumnavigated the Earth in 8 days, 18 hours and 49 minutes, setting a new world record for a light airplane, breaking the previous mark, set in 1959, of 25 days.
The first U.S. Polaris submarines arrived at the new submarine base at Scotland's Holy Loch, as the nuclear missile bearing USS Patrick Henry sailed past protesters and in alongside its tending ship, USS Proteus, to begin a two-year mission.
Mercury spacecraft No. 10 was accepted and delivered to the McDonnell altitude test facility on March 31, 1961, for an orbital-flight environmental test.
Died: 
Sir Thomas Beecham, 81, English conductor who founded the London Philharmonic and the Royal Philharmonic orchestras 
Gala Galaction, 81, Romanian author

March 9, 1961 (Thursday)
In Japan's worst coal mine disaster since World War II, an underground fire killed 71 miners at the Ueda Mine Company at Kawara.
Sputnik 9 was launched by the USSR from Baikonur LC1, carrying "Ivan Ivanovich" (a dummy cosmonaut), the dog Chernushka, mice, and a guinea pig. NASA spokesman George M. Law said that the test showed that the Russians were "about ready to put a man up".
Born:  
Andrei Ivanțoc, Moldovan union leader and presidential candidate, in Opaci, Moldavian SSR, Soviet Union 
Mike Leach, American college football coach, in Susanville, California
Rick Steiner, American pro wrestler, as Robert Rechsteiner in Bay City, Michigan

March 10, 1961 (Friday)
The first definite proof that a signal could be sent to Venus and returned to Earth, using radar astronomy, was made by the Jet Propulsion Laboratory.  Transmission was sent from the Goldstone Tracking Station in California at a 2,388 megacycle frequency, traveling 35 million miles to Venus and then back to Earth, in a little more than six minutes.  Signals had been bounced off of Venus before, but never received back clearly enough to be "immediately detectable".
Richard Sullivan, a staffer at the Port Authority of New York and New Jersey, delivered a feasibility study to the Authority, entitled "A World Trade Center in the Port of New York", outlining the justification for building what would become the Twin Towers and five other buildings in the World Trade Center complex.<ref>
James Glanz and Eric Lipton, City in the Sky: The Rise and Fall of the World Trade Center (Macmillan, 2003) p52</ref>
Born:  
Mitch Gaylord, first American gymnast to score a 10.00 in Olympic competition (1984); in Van Nuys, California 
Greg Kolodziejzyk, Canadian cyclist and holder of world records on recumbent bicycles; in Fort St. John, British Columbia

March 11, 1961 (Saturday)
"Ken", a doll to accompany the popular Barbie that had been brought out by the Mattel toy company introduced on March 9, 1959, was introduced at the annual American International Toy Fair in New York City.
Plans for an invasion of Cuba were presented by CIA official Richard M. Bissell, Jr. for the approval of President Kennedy.  In a meeting attended by the President, Secretary of State Dean Rusk, Defense Secretary Robert McNamara, CIA Director Allen Dulles, and General Lyman Lemnitzer, Chairman of the Joint Chiefs of Staffs, Bissell outlined the proposed "Operation Trinidad", with an invasion force storming the beaches of Trinidad, Cuba by sea and by air.  Kennedy rejected the plan as "too spectacular", and directed Bissell to come up with a less obvious placement of troops.  Only four days later, Bissell had drawn up a new plan, with the force to strike at the Bay of Pigs within a month.  "The Kennedy team was impressed," one historian would say later, "when they should have been incredulous."
Died: William A. Morgan, 33, former American soldier who later became an advisor to Fidel Castro, was executed by a firing squad in Havana after being found guilty of conspiring against the government.

March 12, 1961 (Sunday)
Miami mobster John Roselli,   who was assisting the CIA in its plans to assassinate Fidel Castro, met with a Cuban contact at the Fontainebleau Hotel in Miami Beach.  Roselli would testify before the U.S. Senate, 14 years later, about the delivery of money and poisoned pills for the contact to place in Castro's food.  Columnist Jack Anderson would break the story in his column of January 18, 1971.  The CIA would acknowledge its involvement 46 years after the fact, with the declassification of documents in 2007.
The long-running BBC radio music show Your Hundred Best Tunes moved to the  Sunday night timeslot with which it would be associated for the next 45 years.

March 13, 1961 (Monday)
One-hundred forty-five people in Kiev were killed in the Kurenivka mudslide, after a dam burst on the Dnieper River at the capital of the Ukrainian SSR.  The disaster was not reported in the Soviet press until March 31, when it was referred to in Pravda.
The summit was scaled by the team of Barry Bishop, Mike Ward, Mike Gill, and Wally Romanes.
U.S. President John F. Kennedy proposed a long-term "Alliance for Progress" between the United States and Latin America.
Cyprus joined the Commonwealth of Nations, becoming the first small nation in the British Commonwealth.

March 14, 1961 (Tuesday)
The first phase of the creation of the New English Bible, begun in 1946 by the Joint Committee on the New Translation of the Bible", was completed with the publication of the revised New Testament. Relying on a re-examination of the oldest texts and conveyance of original meanings into modern English, the "new New Testament" was released to coincide with the 350th anniversary of the March 1611 publication of the King James Version of the Bible.
The patent application for the lifesaving opioid antidote naloxone (more commonly known as Narcan) was filed by Jack Fishman and Mozes J. Lewenstein.  U.S. Patent #3,254,088 was granted on May 31, 1966.
Atlas launch vehicle 100-D was delivered to Cape Canaveral for the Mercury-Atlas 3 (MA-3) mission.
A B-52F-70-BW Stratofortress bomber, with two nuclear weapons, crashed 15 miles southwest of Yuba City, California after its crew bailed out. The two nuclear bombs were torn from the aircraft on impact, but did not detonate.
Born:
Mike Lazaridis, founder of Research In Motion, in Istanbul
Kirby Puckett, American baseball player (Minnesota Twins) and Hall of Famer, in Chicago (d. 2006)

March 15, 1961 (Wednesday)
The Union of Peoples of Angola, led by Holden Roberto, crossed over from the Congo into Angola, and murdered European and African residents living near the northern border of the Portuguese colony.  Portuguese forces killed tens of thousands of African residents in retaliation and the war continued for 14 years.
At a meeting in London of the prime ministers of the British Commonwealth, Hendrik Verwoerd announced that South Africa was withdrawing its membership, due to continued criticism of apartheid, "the racial policy of the Union Government".
The World Chess Championship 1961 between former world champion Mikhail Botvinnik and titleholder Mikhail Tal, began in Moscow.
Died: Sir Walter Womersley, 1st Baronet, 83, British M.P.; as Minister of Pensions from 1939 to 1945, he was the only British government minister to hold the same post throughout World War II.

March 16, 1961 (Thursday)
The NASA Goddard Space Flight Center was officially dedicated in Greenbelt, Maryland, US.
The Space Task Group recommended that the Department of Defense give consideration to assigning weather reconnaissance missions to the Air Weather Service preceding Project Mercury orbital missions beginning with Mercury-Atlas 4 (MA-4).
Mercury spacecraft No. 10 was withdrawn from the flight program and was allocated to a ground test simulating orbital flight environmental conditions at the McDonnell plant site.
The Space Task Group advised the Goddard Space Flight Center that for all Mercury orbital missions, beginning with Mercury-Atlas 3 (MA-3), trajectory data would be required for postflight analysis.
Mission rules for Mercury-Atlas 3 (MA-3) were published. Revisions were issued on April 4 and April 20, 1961.
The 18th Golden Globe Awards were held. Winners included Burt Lancaster (Best Actor – Drama), Greer Garson (Best Actress – Drama) and Spartacus (Best Film – Drama).The Absent-Minded Professor, a Disney comedy science fiction film starring Fred MacMurray, was released nationwide and became one of the most popular movies of the year.

March 17, 1961 (Friday)
Albert DeSalvo was arrested in Cambridge, Massachusetts, while trying to break into a house.  Confessing to be a sexual predator who had been nicknamed "the Measuring Man", DeSalvo spent a year in jail.  For 18 months following his release, thirteen local women were sexually assaulted and murdered.  DeSalvo, arrested later in 1964, confessed to being the "Boston Strangler".
Israel staged a dress rehearsal for a military parade in the Israeli-occupied part of Jerusalem, in which heavy military armament took part.
Born:  
Mauricio Pimiento, Colombian politician involved in the Colombian parapolitics scandal, in Bucaramanga. 
Marcus Dillistone, Royal premiered and award-winning British film director.
Died: Susanna M. Salter, 101, first woman mayor in the United States; in 1887, she was elected to a two-year term as mayor of the small town of Argonia, Kansas, after being placed on the ballot as a prank.

March 18, 1961 (Saturday)Nous les amoureux sung by Jean-Claude Pascal (music by Jacques Datin, lyrics by Maurice Vidalin) won the Eurovision Song Contest 1961 for Luxembourg.
Little Joe 5A (LJ-5A), the sixth in the series of Little Joe missions, was launched from Wallops Island. This flight was intended to satisfy test objectives, which were not met previously because of the failure of the spacecraft to separate from the launch vehicle during the Little Joe 5 (LJ-5) mission flown on November 8, 1960. The purpose of this test was to demonstrate primarily the structural integrity of the spacecraft and the escape system during an escape maneuver initiated at the highest dynamic pressure anticipated during an Atlas launch for orbital flight. Little Joe 5A (LJ-5A) lifted off normally, but 19 seconds later the escape tower fired prematurely, a situation closely resembling the November 1960 flight. The signal to initiate the abort maneuver was given; and the launch vehicle-adapter clamp ring was released as intended, but the spacecraft remained on the launch vehicle since the escape motor was already expended. The separation was effected by using the retrorockets, but this command was transmitted before the flight had reached its apex, where separation had been planned. Therfore, the separation was rather violent. In fact, this spacecraft was later used for the subsequent Little Joe 5B (LJ-5B) flight test. Test objectives of the Little Joe 5A (LJ-5A) were not met.

March 19, 1961 (Sunday)
Tornadoes swept through four districts of East Pakistan (now Bangladesh, killing more than 250 people.  The dead included 32 people who had taken refuge in a Catholic church in Dacca after attending Sunday mass.
Died: Ada Cornaro, 79, Argentinian tango dancer and actress

March 20, 1961 (Monday)
Following a complaint by Jordan about the events of March 17, the Mixed Armistice Commission decided that "this act by Israel is a breach of the General Armistice Agreement".
Between this date and April 13, 1961, Phase III of the Mercury spacecraft airdrop program was conducted. Primary objectives of the drops were to study further the spacecraft suitability and flotation capability after water impact. Six drops were made, but later (April 24-28, 1961) the tests were extended for two additional drops to monitor hard-surface landing effects. In the water phase of the program, spacecraft components under particular scrutiny were the lower pressure bulkhead and its capability to withstanding heat shield recontact without impairing flotation capability. Helicopters were used to make the drops.
Trajectory data for the Mercury-Redstone Booster-Development (MR-BD) flight test were forwarded by Marshall Space Flight Center to the Space Task Group and other interested organizations. The purpose of this flight test was to provide a final check of the launch vehicle system prior to the crewed suborbital flights.
Born: John Clark Gable, American film actor, in Los Angeles four months after the death of his father, film star Clark Gable

March 21, 1961 (Tuesday)
The press agency United News of India dispatched its first reports to subscribers.
Ion Gheorghe Maurer, formerly the ceremonial Romanian head of state as President of the Presidium of the Great National Assembly, assumed the office of head of government as Prime Minister of Romania, and would remain the premier until 1974. During Maurer's rule, he would serve the General Secretary of the Romanian Communist Party, Gheorghe Gheorghiu-Dej and later Nicolae Ceaușescu.
The Beatles— John, Paul, George and Stu (Stuart Sutcliffe)— began the first of nearly 300 regular performances at The Cavern Club in Liverpool. Sutcliffe left the band three months later. Continuing with Ringo Starr, the group's final appearance at the Cavern Club was on August 3, 1963.
The Mercury-Atlas Missile Range Projects Office, headed by Elmer H. Buller, was designated as a staff function of the Space Task Group Director's office.

March 22, 1961 (Wednesday)
Dwight D. Eisenhower was restored to the United States Army and to his rank as a five-star General of the Army, two months after completing his term as the 34th President of the United States.  General Eisenhower had resigned his commission on July 18, 1952, after accepting the Republican Party nomination for the Presidency.
Died: Gideon Mer, 66, Israeli physician and scientist who guided the eradication of malaria in the Jewish state.

March 23, 1961 (Thursday)
An American C-47 transport plane with eight men aboard disappeared over the war-torn nation of Laos after taking off from Vientiane toward Saigon. The U.S. Air Force did not announce the incident until two days later. The sole survivor, Major Lawrence R. Bailey, Jr., was captured and became the first American POW of the Vietnam Era. He would be released on August 15, 1962.
The Soviet Union lifted censorship restrictions for foreign news correspondents that had been in place since 1917. Except for two occasions in 1939 and 1946, non-Soviet reporters had been required to have their dispatches reviewed before transmission. Foreign office press director Mikhail Kharlamov cautioned that, although pre-approval of reports would no longer be required, foreigners were still required to keep copies of all dispatches for future review, and that persons who "circulated unfounded rumors about the Soviet Union" were still subject to expulsion.
President John F. Kennedy advised Representative Overton Brooks (D-La.) that he had no intention "to subordinate" the space activities of the National Aeronautics and Space Administration to those of the military.
Born: George Weber, American radio personality, in Philadelphia (murdered 2009)
Died:  
Valentin Bondarenko, 24, Russian cosmonaut, was burned to death in a training accident. His death would be concealed by the Soviet government for more than 25 years, finally being revealed in 1986 in an article in the daily newspaper Izvestia. 
Heinrich Rau, 61, East German politician and Minister of Foreign Trade

March 24, 1961 (Friday)
The Mercury-Redstone BD (Mercury-Redstone Booster Development) rocket was launched from Cape Canaveral, Florida, on one final test flight to certify its safety for human transport. After analyzing launch vehicle behavior in the Mercury-Redstone 1A (MR-1A) and Mercury-Redstone 2 (MR-2), officials at the Marshall Space Flight Center and the Space Task Group were of the opinion that there were a number of problems that needed to be corrected prior to the advent of crewed flight. The problems to be resolved included jet-vane vibration, instrumentation compartment vibration, failure of the thrust-controller system, and several other areas that needed attention. Many of these problems were studied by the personnel of engineering activities and proposed solutions were formulated. It was felt, however, that flight was necessary to verify the corrections and the Mercury-Redstone Booster Development test was scheduled and flown. As with earlier Soviet tests, the American space capsule carried a test dummy. All test objectives were met; as a result of this test, the launch vehicle was man-rated for the planned suborbital flights. Stopped by Wernher von Braun from going, Alan Shepard had volunteered to take the flight, and would have become the first human to travel into outer space. Less than three weeks later, Soviet cosmonaut Yuri Gagarin would reach the milestone on April 12. Shepard would reach space, though not orbit, on May 5.

March 25, 1961 (Saturday)
In Kansas City, the University of Cincinnati Bearcats upset the #1 ranked Ohio State Buckeyes, 70-65, to win the NCAA basketball championship.  Going into the title match, OSU had won 32 consecutive games with a team that included John Havlicek and Jerry Lucas.  Future Indiana University coach Bobby Knight had kept OSU from losing in regulation by scoring the basket that tied the game 61-61.
The day after the U.S. launch of a test dummy into space, the Soviets made one final launch of their own Ivan Ivanovich dummy into space, along with the last dog in space, Zvezdochka.  Both went up on Sputnik 10, which made one orbit and safely returned to Earth.

March 26, 1961 (Sunday)
In rugby union, France defeated Wales 8–6 at the Stade Colombes to assure themselves of overall victory in the 1961 Five Nations Championship.
The Lombank Trophy was held at Snetterton Motor Racing Circuit, England, and was won by Jack Brabham in a Cooper T53.
Born: Billy Warlock, American TV soap opera actor, in Gardena, California
Died: Carlos Duarte Costa, 72, founder of the Brazilian Catholic Apostolic Church

March 27, 1961 (Monday)Thunderball'', the ninth James Bond novel by Ian Fleming, was first published, in a hardback British edition by Glidrose Productions.
Nine African-American students from Mississippi's Tougaloo College made the first effort of passive resistance to end segregation in the state capital, Jackson, by walking into the whites-only main branch of the municipal public library. After beginning the "read-in", the students declined to leave and were arrested by police. The next day, black students at Jackson State College marched to the city jail to protest the arrest of the "Tougaloo Nine", and more demonstrations followed.
In a NASA Headquarters' note to editors of magazines and newspapers, procedures and a deadline were established for submitting the applications of accredited correspondents to cover the Mercury-Redstone 3 (MR-3) flight mission. As of April 24, 1961, the deadline date, 350 correspondents were accredited to cover the launch, the first crewed suborbital flight of Project Mercury.
Born: Leigh Bowery, Australian performance artist, in Melbourne (died 1994)
Died: Paul Landowski, 85, French monumental sculptor

March 28, 1961 (Tuesday)
U.S. President John F. Kennedy informed Congress that, as part of the proposed $43.8 billion defense budget, he was cancelling the Pye Wacket project, an experimental lenticular-form air-to-air missile, and the B-70 nuclear-powered airplane.  Kennedy declared that "As a power which will never strike first, our hopes for anything close to an absolute deterrent must rest on weapons which come from hidden, moving, or invulnerable bases which will not be wiped out by a surprise attack," and lobbied instead for ten additional Polaris nuclear submarines and an increased Minuteman nuclear arsenal.
All 52 people aboard ČSA Flight 511, a Czechoslovak State Airlines Ilyushin-18 airplane, died when it crashed near Russelbach in East Germany after an onboard explosion. The flight was on its way from Prague to Bamako, the capital of Mali, taking technicians and their families, half of them from the Soviet Union, to jobs in Africa.
Air Afrique was founded by agreement of ten West African nations that had gained independence from France. The airline operated until 2001, when its fleet and routes were acquired by Air France.
The Factories Act 1961 was introduced into the Parliament of the United Kingdom.
Died:  
Powel Crosley Jr., American inventor and owner of the Cincinnati Reds baseball team 
Chatta Singh, 74, Indian VC recipient

March 29, 1961 (Wednesday)
The Twenty-third Amendment to the United States Constitution was ratified, allowing residents of Washington, D.C., to vote in presidential elections.  With at least 3/4ths of the 50 states needed to ratify the amendment New Hampshire became the 37th state to approve the measure at 1:01 pm.  Thirteen minutes later in Topeka, the Kansas House of Representatives, in a hastily called session, made that state the 38th. Arkansas was the only state to reject the proposal, which gave the District 3 electoral votes starting with the 1964 election.
Born: Amy Sedaris, American actress, comedienne, and writer, in Endicott, New York

March 30, 1961 (Thursday)
The Single Convention on Narcotic Drugs was signed at New York City. The pact entered into force on December 13, 1964, and now applies to 149 nations.
Redstone launch vehicle No. 7 was delivered to Cape Canaveral for the Mercury-Redstone 3 (MR-3) mission.
Actor Ronald Reagan gave a speech entitled "Encroaching Control" to the Phoenix Chamber of Commerce. This speech was considered by some historians to be his finest and the moment his political career truly began.
Died:
Former Brigadier General Mengistu Neway, 41, was hanged after the unsuccessful coup attempt against the Ethiopian government in December 1960.
Armand Robin, 49, French poet and journalist, three days after his arrest following an altercation in a bar.

March 31, 1961 (Friday)
The last train ran on Ireland's Cork, Bandon and South Coast Railway.

As of this date, all stations of NASA's world-wide Mercury tracking network were classed as being operational. An industrial team headed by the Western Electric Company would turn over the $60,000,000 global network to NASA in a formal ceremony later in the year.
Died: The Ayatollah Seyyed Hossein Borujerdi, 86, leader of Iran's Shiite Muslims. His death led the way to the ascension of the 58-year-old Ayatollah Ruhollah Khomeini, who in 1979 would become the leader of the Islamic Republic of Iran.

References

1961
1961-03
1961-03